A decrepit car is a car that is often old and damaged and is in a barely functional state. There are many slang terms used to describe such cars, the most popular being junk car.

Age, neglect, and damage tend to increase the expense of maintaining a vehicle. The vehicle may reach a point where this expense would be considered to outweigh the value of keeping it. Such vehicles are generally stripped for parts or abandoned. However, abandoning a vehicle on the road as a parked car is illegal in many jurisdictions and if a vehicle remains parked, the local authority commonly tows it to the scrapyard. Some owners choose to keep the vehicle. These old, neglected, and oftentimes barely functional cars have been used not only for transport, but also as racing vehicles. Their use has earned them a place in popular culture.

History
During the 1930s, particularly in the wake of the Great Depression, the market for used cars first started to grow and decrepit cars were often a poor man's form of transport. Cheap dealers could obtain the cars for very little, make aesthetic adjustments, and sell the car for much more. Early hot rodders also purchased decrepit cars as the basis for racers, and early stock car racing was called banger racing in the United Kingdom and jalopy racing in the United States.

A jalopy was an old-style class of stock car racing in America, often raced on dirt ovals. It was originally a beginner class behind midgets, but vehicles became more expensive with time. Jalopy races began in the 1930s and ended in the 1960s. The race car needed to be from before around 1941. Notable racers include Parnelli Jones. In the 1960s, the Ministry Of Transport Test (MOT) was introduced, in an effort to increase road safety. Many decrepit cars that were missing important parts such as functioning brakes and lights failed the MOT and were scrapped, ending the age of the decrepit car in England.

Terminology

Numerous slang terms are used to describe such cars, which vary by country and region, including hooptie, jalopy, shed, clunker, lemon, banger, bomb, beater, bunky, old bomb, rust bucket, voodoo, wreck, heap, bucket, paddock basher, paddock bomb, death trap, disaster on wheels, rattletrap, or shitbox.

Australian English
In Australian slang the terms rust bucket, bunky, old bomb, paddock basher or bomb are used to refer to old, rusty and/or rundown cars. The term 'paddock bomb' or 'paddock basher' often refers specifically to a car no longer fit to drive on public roads, but driven in a local paddock for recreation or sport. Many rural children learn to drive in an unregulated way in a paddock bomb.

The term shitbox may refer to an unprepossessing but probably roadworthy vehicle, celebrated in the biannual (autumn and spring) Shitbox Rally, an Australian fundraiser for cancer charities.

British English
In British slang the terms old rust bucket or simply bucket are used to refer to decrepit cars but the favoured term is old banger, often shortened to banger. The origin of the word is unknown, but could refer to the older poorly maintained vehicles' tendency to back-fire. The term shed is also used.

North American English

In North American slang jalopy, clunker, heap, rust bucket and bucket are also used.  So too are beater—a term especially favored in Canada—and the American urban hooptie, which gained some popularity from the humorous song "My Hooptie" by Sir Mix-a-Lot.

The word jalopy was once common but is now somewhat archaic. Jalopy seems to have replaced flivver, which in the early decades of the 20th century also simply meant "a failure". Other early terms for a wreck of a car included heap, tin lizzy (1915) and crate (1927), which probably derived from the WWI pilots' slang for an old, slow and unreliable aeroplane. In the latter half of the 20th century more coarse terms became popular, such as "shitbox".

The origin of jalopy is unknown, but the earliest written use that has been found was in 1924. It is possible that the longshoremen in New Orleans referred to the scrapped autos destined for scrapyards in Jalapa, Mexico, according to this destination, in which they pronounced the letter J as in English. Another possible origin is the French "chaloupe," motorboat, perhaps imitating the sound an old car would make.

A 1929 definition of jalopy reads as follows: "a cheap make of automobile; an automobile fit only for junking". The definition has stayed the same, but it took a while for the spelling to standardize. Among the variants have been jallopy, jaloppy, jollopy, jaloopy, jalupie, julappi, jalapa and jaloppie. John Steinbeck spelled it gillopy in In Dubious Battle (1936). The term was used extensively in the book On the Road by Jack Kerouac, first published in 1957, although written from 1947.

The Georgia Institute of Technology, an engineering school in Atlanta, takes pride in the practice of engineering students maintaining antique cars, and the school maintains the Ramblin' Wreck, a popular mascot of the school. Their college radio station, WREK, is also named after the iconic car.

The term was also used throughout the history of Archie Comics, specifically referring to Archie Andrews' red, open-top antique car.

In 2009 the term "clunker" was heavily used in reference to the Car Allowance Rebate System in the United States, which was also known as the "Cash for Clunkers Program".

Decrepit cars used on Indian reservations in the United States and Indian reserves in Canada are often referred to by their owners as reservation cars or rez runners for short. The culture of the rez car was explored in the documentary film Reel Injun, and also figured briefly in the feature film Smoke Signals. Keith Secola (Ojibwa) recorded the song "NDN KARS" describing such a vehicle in 1987. Originally appearing as a cassette release, it was used in the Native critically acclaimed film Dance Me Outside. It is on his album Circle (AKINA Records, 1992). Activist Russell Means's humorous poem "Indian Cars Go Far" (1993) also describes the "Indian car" as a decrepit vehicle.

See also

 24 Hours of LeMons
 Art car
 Banger racing
 Barn find
 Bush Mechanics
 Cash for Clunkers
 Demolition derby
 Depreciation
 Lemon (automobile)
 Milo tin, a Malaysian pejorative term referring to poorly-repaired cars or those of shoddy workmanship.
 Pimp My Ride
 Vehicle scrappage scheme (United Kingdom)
 Wrecking yard

References

External links 

 How to Get Rid of an Old Car - WikiHow article on getting rid of a decrepit car

Car ownership
Slang
Automotive terminology
Product expiration
Waste minimisation
Conservation and restoration of vehicles